Leptostylus calcarius is a species of longhorn beetles of the subfamily Lamiinae. It was described by Chevrolat in 1862, and is known from Cuba.

References

Leptostylus
Beetles described in 1862
Endemic fauna of Cuba